Scandinavian York, Viking York or Norwegian York is a term used by historians for, what is now, Yorkshire during the period of the late 9th century and first half of the 10th century, when it was dominated by Norse warrior-kings; in particular, it is used to refer to York, the city controlled by these kings. The Kingdom of Jórvíc was closely associated with the much longer-lived Kingdom of Dublin throughout this period.

History

Pre-Viking age

York was first recorded by Ptolemy around the year 150 as Eborakon. Under the Romans it became the provincial capital and bishopric of Eburacum. The Roman settlement was regularly planned, well defended and contained a stone legionary fortress. The Romans withdrew around 407 and the Anglo-Saxons occupied the settlement from the early 7th century. Post-Roman York was in the kingdom of Deira, it was taken over in 655 by its northern neighbour Bernicia to form the kingdom of Northumbria. The Anglo-Saxon king Edwin of Northumbria was baptized there in 627 and the first Anglo-Saxon archbishop Ecgbert of York consecrated in 780.   The settlement became the Anglo-Saxon trading port of Eoforwic.

Viking invasion
The Vikings had been raiding the coasts of England from the late 8th century, but in 865 a Viking army landed  with the intention of conquering rather than just raiding. The Anglo-Saxon Chronicle described the army as the "mycel heathen here" (Great Heathen Army).  They landed in East Anglia where the locals, under Edmund of East Anglia, "made peace" with them in return for  horses.

The army, led by Ivar the Boneless and his half-brother Halfdan Ragnarsson, made its way north to Northumbria where the Anglo-Saxons were embroiled in a civil war. In 862 the ruler of Northumbria, Osberht, had been deposed by Ælla of Northumbria. Ivar the Boneless was able to capitalize on the Anglo-Saxons disarray and captured York in 866/ 867.

Scandinavian rule 866-901
After Ivar the Boneless had annexed York,  the two Anglo-Saxon leaders settled their differences, they joined forces and attempted to retake the city. When the Northumbrians attacked, the Vikings withdrew behind the crumbling Roman city walls, but the Anglo-Saxon leaders were both killed and the Northumbrians defeated during the ensuing battle on 21 March 867. Symeon of Durham wrote:

The remaining Northumbrian leaders, probably led by archbishop, Wulfhere, "made peace" with the Vikings. The Vikings appointed a compliant native prince Ecgberht as puppet ruler of Northumbria. Five years later, in 872, when the Great Army was elsewhere, the local Northumbrians capitalized on their absence by driving Wulfhere and Ecgberht out. The two exiles found refuge at the court of Burgred of Mercia. The revolt was short lived with the Vikings regaining control of York in 873. Wulfhere was recalled to the See but the Anglo-Saxon Ricsige became ruler, as Ecgberht died in 873.

In 875/ 876 part of the Great Army returned, headed by Halfdan Ragnarsson. York was retaken and although Halfdan was proclaimed King of Northumbria, in reality he was only the ruler of southern Northumbria (Deira). Deira became known as the Kingdom of York (Jórvík) with Halfdan as its first king. According to the Anglo Saxon Chronicle:
 
Halfdan's reign did not last long, as he was killed, trying to assert his claim to the Kingdom of Dublin, in 877. 

There was an interregnum after Halfdan died until Guthred became king in 883. Guthred was the first Christian Viking king of York. It is traditionally thought that Guthreds election was sponsored by  Archbishop Wulfhere's religious community from Lindisfarne.  Churches and religious centres in Northumbria had been systematically stripped of their wealth since the arrival of the Vikings, however although it had become impoverished the amount of ecclesiastical artefacts that have been excavated in York, from  various periods between the 7th and 11th centuries, indicate that the cathedral remained a religious centre throughout.  Guthred died in 895 and was buried at York Minster.
 
Siefredus of Northumbria replaced Guthred as ruler of Jórvík and although not a great deal is known about him there has been some information provided by coin evidence. A substantial find in the Ribble Valley, during the 19th century, now known as the Cuerdale Hoard, contained approximately 8,000 Anglo-Scandinavian coins as well as continental and Kufic coins. Some of the coins discovered have Siefredus's name on providing an indication to when he reigned. The coin evidence suggests that Siefredus succeeded Guthfrith and ruled from about 895 until 900. 

The medieval chronicler Æthelweard  has led some historians to suggest that Siefriedus maybe the same person, as Sichfrith, who had previously  been raiding the coast of Wessex.

A further hypothesis, proposed by the historian Alfred P. Smyth, is that Siefriedus is the same as the jarl Sichfrith  who lay claim to the Kingdom of Dublin in that same year.

The Cuerdale Hoard also contained some coins with the name Cnut or Knútr on them, the coin evidence suggests that he reigned between 900 and 905. He is listed as ruler of York but has proved to be something of a conundrum,  for historians, as Cnut is not recorded on any written contemporary sources.  Historians have posited several hypotheses. These include, "no coins have been found from Gunfriths reign so perhaps they could be his? ". As some of the coins had both Siefredus and Cnuts name on them "perhaps these are the same person?". Another possibility is that he was "a Danish noble, mentioned in Norse sources, who was assassinated in 902 after a very brief reign. So brief that there was not enough time to produce coins in quantity."

A West Saxon rules Northumbria
The next ruler Æthelwold, was the son of Æthelred , the king of Wessex from  865 to 871. Following his father's death, in 871, his uncle, Alfred the Great became king. When Alfred died in 899 Alfred's son Edward the Elder ascended the throne of Wessex. However, Æthelwold made a bid for power seizing his fathers old estate in Wimbourne. Edwards forces besieged Æthelwold's position forcing him to flee. He went to York where the locals accepted him as king, in 901, even though he was an Anglo-Saxon.According to the Anglo Saxon Chronicle:

 

Æthelwold, did not stay in York long as in 903 he began a campaign to regain the crown of Wessex. The Anglo Saxon Chronicle describes how he raised a fleet and landed first in Essex then went on to East Anglia where he persuaded their king Eohric to help him in his campaign. The combined armies raided Wessex in the Cricklade area. Edward and his allies responded by attacking East Anglia. Edwards Kentish allies engaged Æthelwold's army, on 13 December 902, at the Battle of Holme where Æthelwold  was killed.

Scandinavia rule restored 903-926
Edward followed up his attack on East Anglia with raids into the Viking kingdom. The following year the Vikings retaliated, led by their new joint kings  Eowils and Halfdan II  their intention was to raid Mercia and Wessex but were intercepted and killed when they met a joint army from Wessex and Mercia at Tettenhall on 5 August 910.

Ragnall I was York's next ruler, he was the grandson of Ímar and was probably one of the Vikings expelled from Dublin in 902. He fought against Constantín II, King of Scotland, in the Battle of Corbridge in 918. It is not clear from the annals, who actually won the  battle,  but  the outcome did allow  Ragnall to establish himself as king at York. It seems that the people of York were unhappy with Ragnall as they promised obedience to Æthelflæd, Lady of the Mercians in early 918,  but the negotiations were ended prematurely by her death  in June of that year. Late on, in his reign, Ragnall submitted to Edward as overlord, but was allowed to keep his kingdom. Ragnall had three separate issues of coins produced while he ruled York the coins  bearing the name RAIENALT, RACNOLDT or similar. He died late in 920 or early 921.

The next ruler was Sihtric, who was  a kinsman of Ragnall,  and  another Viking leader that had been expelled from the Kindom of Dublin, in 902.  Sihtric, however had returned to Ireland to retake Dublin and become their king. Then in 920 he  travelled to York and joined  Ragnall where in 921 Ragnall died and Sihtric replaced him as king.

Sihtric raided Davenport, Cheshire, in violation of the terms of submission agreed between Ragnall and Edward. Edward the Elder died in 924. It seems that Sihtric took advantage of the situation to expand his kingdom. There is some numismatic evidence to support this as there are coins, from this time, minted at Lincoln, in the Kingdom of  Mercia, as well those from York.

Edward was replaced by his son Æthelstan, and although the annals indicated that Sihtric was reluctant to submit to Edward, he submitted to  Æthelstan at Tamworth in January 926. Part of the agreement was that Sihtric should marry Æthelstan's sister Eadgyth also he should be baptised. According to Roger of Wendover, Sihtric was baptised but he "repudiated" the faith and rejected his bride shortly after, without the marriage being consummated.

West Saxon rule 927-939
In 927 Sihtric died. His brother Gofraid left Dublin and headed to Northumbria to replace Sihtric as king, however Gofraid's attempt to rule was unsuccessful, and he was driven out by King Æthelstan. The Anglo-Saxon Chronicle makes no mention of Gofraid, simply stating that Æthelstan succeeded Sihtric as King in Northumbria, and thereafter held a meeting with the other kings in Britain, establishing peace. A later account by William of Malmesbury tells a different story. In his version, Gofraid goes to Scotland following Sihtric's death, to attend a meeting at Dacre with Æthelstan, Constantine II of Scotland, and Owen I of Strathclyde. Gofraid and a Viking ally called Thurfrith led a force to York and besieged the city. Æthelstan counter attacked and Gofraid was captured. The city was then looted by the Anglo-Saxons and Gofraid allowed to return to Ireland.

In 937 a coalition of Viking's (led by Gofraid's son  Olaf Guthfrithson), Constantine II, King of Scotland, and Owain, King of Strathclyde invaded England. The invaders were stopped and defeated by Æthelstan, and his allies, at the Battle of Brunanburh . After this, although Æthelstan's relationship with  Northumbria was not an easy one, his hold on it remained  secure till his death in 939.

During his reign, Æthelstan integrated Northumbria into England and the design of the coinage was changed to conform with the standard English system. On some coins, produced at  York, the mint-signature was  Eforwic, the Old English name for York.

Restoration of Scandinavian rule 939-944

Although Æthelstan had integrated the Anglo-Saxon kingdoms into one unified England and suppressed opposition from the Vikings and their allies.  When he died in 939, the Viking leader Olaf Guthfrithson (who had been defeated at the Brunanburh) was able to travel from Dublin and take over Northumbria with minimal opposition. Coins minted at York during his reign show the Raven motif.  

In 940, his cousin Olaf Cuaran joined him in York. In 941 Olaf Guthfrithson invaded Mercia and East Anglia The Archbishops of York and Canterbury mediated and  Edmund I, Æthelstan's successor, surrendered much of the south-east Midlands and Lincolnshire.

It is probable that Olaf Guthfrithson died in 942 and was replaced by Olaf Cuaran. Then in 943 the Anglo-Saxon Chronicle says that Olaf Cuaran was baptised, with Edmund  as sponsor, and that same year, another king of Northumbria, was named as Ragnall Guthfrithson and he was confirmed also with Edmund as sponsor. Both Olaf and Ragnall are called king, but it is uncertain whether they were co-rulers or rival kings.

The chronology of events for both Olaf Guthfrithson, Olaf Cuaranths and Ragnalls' reigns have been subject to debate however the annals for 944 all seem to agree that Edmund was able to expel the Viking leaders from Northumbria.

English rule 944-947
In 945, Edmund invaded Cumbria and blinded two sons of Domnall mac Eógain, king of Strathclyde. Then according to the Anglo-Saxon Chronicle he "granted all of Strathclyde, to Malcom king of the Scots in return for an alliance. 

 

In 946 Edmund was assassinated at Pucklechurch. 

Edmund was replaced by Eadred who immediately turned his attention to Northumbria, where according to the Anglo-Saxon Chronicle, he "subdued all Northumberland under his power" and obtained oaths of obedience from the Scots. 

In 947 Eadred went to the Anglo-Scandinavian town of Tanshelf, where Archbishop Wulfan and the Northumbrian witan  submitted to him.

Scandinavian rule reestablished 948-954
Eric Bloodaxe capitalizing on the deteriorating political situation in York, established himself as king. Eadreds, response was to raid Northumbria and drive Eric out.  Olaf Cuaran was reestablished as king from 950-952. Olaf's rule was shortlived as in 952 Eric removed him and then reigned in Northumbria till 954.

The Earldom of York 954-1066

Scandinavian domination came to an end when Eadred's forces killed Eric Bloodaxe at the Battle of Stainmore in 954. From then on the whole area was governed by earls, from the local nobility, appointed by the kings of England.

In 975 the king of England Edgar died suddenly. The succession was contested between his two sons Edward and Æthelred. Edward became king but was killed under suspicious circumstances in 978. Æthelred replaced him as ruler and in  1002 he was told that the Danish men in his territory "would faithlessly take his life, and then all his councillors, and possess his kingdom afterwards". In response, he ordered the deaths of all Danes living in England. The orders were carried out on 13 November 1002 (now known as the St Brice's Day massacre).

It is thought that the massacre provoked the king of Denmark, Sweyn Forkbeard, to invade England in 1003. The onslaught continued until 1014 when Æthelred and his family were driven into exile and Sweyn installed as king of England. However he only reigned for five weeks before dying. 

After Sweyn’s death, his son  Cnut became the leader of the Danish army and Æthelred returned to England. Æthelred drove Cnut out of England and back to Denmark. Then in 1015, Cnut relaunched the campaign against England.

Meanwhile in 1016 Æthelred died and was  succeeded by his son, Edmund Ironside. Edmund and his forces were decisively beaten by Cnut at the Battle of Ashingdon. After the battle, Cnut made a treaty with Edmund whereby  Edmund would be king of Wessex and Cnut would rule the rest of England.

Ironside died just a few weeks after the treaty. Cnut then became king of all England. He divided England into earldoms and appointed his most trusted followers as earls. He appointed Erik of Hlathir to the Earldom of Northumbria, replacing the previous Earl of Northumbria Uhtred, who Cnut had murdered.

Although some of the early Earls of York were Nordic like the Jórvík Kings, they were succeeded by Normans after the Norman conquest. William the Conqueror ended the region's last vestiges of independence and established garrisoned castles in the city. The Earldom of York was abolished by King Henry II.

Commerce

Coinage
Small silver coins, known as sceattas,  were minted in England by the early 8th century, and from the late 8th century, locally produced coins of this nature have been excavated in York.   The bankrupt nature of the Northumbrian economy is illustrated by the continued production of  small silver coins and eventually replacing them with copper pennies (known as stycas) while the other English kingdoms were producing the larger standard silver penny established by Offa of Mercia. The minting of coinage in York was controlled by the Northumbrian monarch and the archbishop.The coins produced under command of the king seems to have stopped around 850 and Archbishop Wulfhere around 855. The vikings reintroduced the minting of coins, in York, 895/896. These coins had a similar design to continental coins, some with short religious texts on them and others with the name of the mint where they were produced, for example EBRAICE for Eboracum (York). Although  where the mint was located, in York has not been identified, a workshop that produced and tested the dies  has been identified at Coppergate.

In about 973 King Edgar, reformed the monetary system to give Anglo-Saxon England a uniform currency. This involved approximately sixty moneyers in the various boroughs around the country.  The most important mints were in London, Winchester, Lincoln, Chester and York. They produced a standard design so that each coin could be used anywhere in England.  The design was changed about every six years. This model for the production of currency remained unchanged until the reign of Henry II, around two hundred years later.

Trade
Archaeological evidence indicates that Jórvík had a  busy international trade with thriving workshops, and well-established mints. York was part of the wider Scandinavian trading system with one route leading to Norway by way of the Shetland Islands and another to Sweden via the Dnieper and Volga rivers to Byzantium and the Muslim world.

York was a major manufacturing centre particularly in metalwork, with Jórvík craftspeople sourcing their raw materials both near and far. There was gold and silver coming from Europe, copper and lead from the Pennines and tin from Cornwall. Also, there was amber from the Baltic for the production of jewellery, and soapstone probably from Norway or Shetland Islands, used to make large cooking pots. Wine was imported from the Rhineland and silk, used to make into caps for sale, came from Byzantium.

Legacy
Between 1070 and 1085, there were occasional attempts by the Danish Vikings to recapture their Kingdom of Jórvík; however, these attempts did not result in the return of the kingdom.

The Old Norse placename Konungsgurtha, Kings Court, recorded in the late fourteenth century in relation to an area immediately outside
the site of the porta principalis sinistra, the east gatehouse of the Roman encampment, perpetuated today as King's Square, which nucleates the Ainsty, perhaps indicates a Viking royal palace site based on the remains of the east gate of the Roman fortress. New streets, lined by regular building fronts for timber houses were added to an enlarging city between 900 and 935, dates arrived at by tree-ring chronology carried out on remaining posts preserved in anaerobic clay subsoil.

Archaeological findings 
From 1976 to 1981, the York Archaeological Trust conducted a five-year excavation in and around the street of Coppergate in central York. This demonstrated that, in the 10th century, Jórvík's trading connections reached to the Byzantine Empire and beyond: a cap made of silk survives, and coins from Samarkand were familiar enough and respected enough for a counterfeit to have passed in trade. Both these items, as well as a large human coprolite known as the Lloyds Bank coprolite, were famously recovered in York a millennium later. Amber from the Baltic is often expected at a Viking site and at Jórvík an impractical and presumably symbolic axehead of amber was found. A cowrie shell indicates contact with the Red Sea or the Persian Gulf.  Although little is known about the internal events of Jórvík, during this time, it is known that there was an accommodation with the church as Christian and pagan objects have survived side-by-side.

After the excavation, the York Archaeological Trust took the decision to recreate the excavated part of Jórvík on the Coppergate site, and this is now the Jorvik Viking Centre.

See also 
Coppergate Helmet
Ebrauc
Harrying of the North
History of York
Raven banner
Uí Ímair

Notes

References

Bibliography

External links 
 Brenda Ralph Lewis & David Nash Ford, "York: Viking Times"
Timeline of Anglo-Saxon England

954 disestablishments
Anglo-Norse England
Former countries in the British Isles
History of York
History of Yorkshire
Viking Age populated places
States and territories established in the 870s
Kingdom of Norway (872–1397)
875 establishments